David Mycock (30 August 1921 – 7 October 1990) was an English professional association football defender. Born in Sunderland, he joined Halifax Town in 1946, making 169 Football League appearances for the club before joining Wigan Athletic in 1952.

References

External links

1921 births
1990 deaths
English footballers
Footballers from Sunderland
Halifax Town A.F.C. players
Wigan Athletic F.C. players
Association football defenders